The  is a river in Kyoto Prefecture and Hyōgo Prefecture, Japan.

References

Rivers of Kyoto Prefecture
Rivers of Hyōgo Prefecture
Rivers of Japan